Manlius Torquatus may refer to one of the following individuals from Roman gens Manlia:

 Aulus Manlius Torquatus Atticus
 Lucius Manlius Torquatus (consul 65 BC)
 Titus Manlius Imperiosus Torquatus, consul in 347, 344, and 340 BC.
 Titus Manlius Torquatus, grandson of the above, consul in 299 BC who died in office.
 Titus Manlius Torquatus, great-grandson of the above, consul in 235 and 224 BC.
 Titus Manlius Torquatus, grandson of the above, consul in 165 BC.

See also